Roque de los Muchachos (English: "Rock of the Boys") is a rocky mound at the highest point on the island of La Palma in the Canary Islands, Spain. The rocks are contained with the Parque Nacional de la Caldera de Taburiente.

From the Roque, one can see the islands of Tenerife, El Hierro and La Gomera.

See also
 List of European ultra prominent peaks

References

La Palma
Mountains of the Canary Islands
Volcanoes of the Canary Islands